Rachel Kadish is an American writer of fiction and non-fiction and the author of several novels and a novella. Her novel The Weight of Ink won the National Jewish Book Award in 2017.

Personal life 
Born in New York City on August 12, 1969, Kadish grew up in Westchester County, New York, where she attended middle school at Solomon Schechter School of Westchester in Hartsdale, and New Rochelle High School.  Kadish received an A.B. from Princeton University in 1991 and an M.A. from New York University in 1994.

Her fiction work has won the National Jewish Book Award and the Julia Ward Howe Prize, the John Gardner Fiction Prize, and the Association of Jewish Libraries Fiction Award.

She is the recipient of fellowships from the National Endowment of the Arts and the Massachusetts Cultural Council, and she teaches in Lesley University's MFA Program in Creative Writing.

She is currently involved in New Voices, a project using the arts to work for tolerance.

Writing career 
Rachel Kadish's 2017 novel, The Weight of Ink, winner of the National Jewish Book Award, is a work of historical fiction set in London of the 1660s and of the early twenty-first century. It tells the interwoven stories of two women: Ester Velasquez, an immigrant from Amsterdam who is permitted to scribe for a blind rabbi just before the plague hits the city; and Helen Watt, an ailing historian with a love of Jewish history.

Her short stories and essays have been read on US National Public Radio and have appeared in publications including The New York Times, The Paris Review, Salon, and The Pushcart Prize Anthology.

Kadish has also written in Quartz magazine about Chiune Sugihara, the Japanese diplomat who saved her family during World War II and in The Paris Review on the importance of historical fiction in illuminating forgotten history.

She is a graduate of Princeton University and New York University.

Bibliography

Novels 

 From a Sealed Room (2006). Boston: Houghton Mifflin 
 Tolstoy Lied: a Love Story (2007). Boston: Mariner Books 
 The Weight of Ink (2017). Boston: Houghton Mifflin Harcourt

Novellas 

 I Was Here (2014 ebook)

References

External links 

 

21st-century American women writers
21st-century American short story writers
American women novelists
American women short story writers
Jewish American novelists
Lesley University faculty
New York University alumni
Princeton University alumni
Living people
1969 births
American women academics
21st-century American novelists